Gerald Donald is a Detroit techno producer and artist. With James Stinson he formed the afrofuturist techno duo Drexciya, and he is the main member of Dopplereffekt.

Biography
Donald is notoriously silent on himself and even his involvement with various musical projects. In a 2013 interview, when asked about his anonymity and his work with James Stinson and Drexciya, he said, "I will not directly indicate my involvement in any project. I will leave this question open to observer interpretation. The most important thing has always been the music and concept itself. I adhere to this philosophy. People spend way too much time engaging personalities rather than the music that’s accompanying that personality." Frequently referred to as an afrofuturist, he said he "do[es] not wish to specify any particular ethnicity."

With Drexciya, he made techno music on which an afrofuturist mythology was built, involving the Drexciyans, an underwater race, "the descendants of the African women thrown overboard in the transatlantic slave trade." Their songs had marine and maritime themes and titles; live, they appeared only masked.

Another musical project of his is Dopplereffekt, with To Nhan Le Thi, to whom he is married.
He is also in electro group Der Zyklus (German  "The Cycle").

Arpanet is one of the pseudonyms of Dopplereffekt's Gerald Donald. It was named after both ARPANET (one of the precursors to the internet) and ARP Instruments, an early synthesizer company. Initially a suspected duo between Drexciya frontmen James Stinson and Gerald Donald, since Stinson's death in 2002, Arpanet is now firmly established as Gerald Donald alone.

Discography

As Arpanet
Wireless Internet (2002), Record Makers
Quantum Transposition (2005), Rephlex
Reference Frame (2006), Record Makers
Inertial Frame (2006), Record Makers

References

External links
 
 
 

Living people
Detroit techno
Musicians from Detroit
Year of birth missing (living people)